The Restless Years is an Australian soap opera which followed the lives of several Sydney school-leavers and the drama and relationships faced by young adults. It was created by Reg Watson and produced by the Reg Grundy Organisation for Network Ten.

The series debuted in a prime time slot on 6 December 1977 (during the end-of-year TV non-ratings period, in the vein of the Seven Network serial Cop Shop, which had premiered the previous week in the out of ratings period) and was creator Watson's second successful soap opera in Australia, following The Young Doctors. It had a successful run of four years, until December 1981, and ran 781 x 30 minute episodes. It was not renewed by the network due to declining ratings. The series had a predominantly young audience.

The series was Grundy's third foray into creating successful soap operas, and followed a similar theme to their previous school room drama Class of '74.

Theme tune
The opening and closing theme title sequence was played over a melancholy piano tune, over a shot of rolling clouds while an angelic chorus would intone, It's only a journey, through our restless years, let our hearts run free...

The rather maudlin tune and refrain set a pensive and sad tone.

In a promotional move, the network had singer Renee Geyer, record a funky rock ballad based on the theme tune, and it was used as the Ten Network'S identification mark

Cast

There was a high turnover of attractive youngsters in the cast, who made up the students of school graduates, including Olivia Baxter, played by Zoe Bertram, and rebellious youth Peter Beckett, played by Nick Hedstrom, however the series' most enduring character would be Dr. Bruce Russell, played by 28 year-old English-born Number 96 star Malcolm Thompson who before settling in Australia had previously spent a 10 month stint featuring in British TV soap opera Coronation Street.

The series made use of established actors to provide the backbone, including former school teacher and dignified middle-aged spinster Miss Elizabeth McKenzie, played by veteran actress June Salter, who would emerge as the heart of the series.

Original cast members Salter and Hedstrom left the series in late 1980 and Bertram left in late 1981, leaving Thompson as the only remaining original cast member, and the only cast member to continue through the show's entire run. Salter and Hedstrom returned for the final episode.

The cast included singer Tom Burlinson and TV personality and then singer Kerri-Anne Kennerley, in an early acting role

Cast

Storylines

The series made use of dramatic storylines involving murders, kidnapping, suicides, amnesia, blackmail, serial killers, blackmail, divorce, and prostitution among the more standard elements such as teenage problems, unemployment, romance, jealousy, money-making schemes, and parental problems.

The show's younger characters were seen living in various share households. Their storylines frequently involved romances, attempts to find a job, career problems. There were some family groups where the parents endured marital infidelity, divorce, problems with their children.

Dr Bruce Russell's first wife, Alison (Julieanne Newbould), suffered a miscarriage and was soon afterwards killed by terrorists while on holiday in Asia. Bruce later married Olivia Baxter. She fell pregnant but there were complications. Bruce arranged for her to have an abortion as the pregnancy could harm her health. After this she became mentally deranged and divorced him. Olivia subsequently snatched a baby and went on the run.

The Restless Years, unlike previous series, did not focus on a physical locale, although presented a loose set of relationships where frequent phone calls defined the facilitated links, and frequently occur in the various foyers of the apartment building where the characters resided. Although various scenes were featured at a local bar called "Thommo's", a much frequented cafe, and subsequently a youth refuge and a cafe called the "Beck and Call", the series although filmed in the in-house studios, including shopping centres, parks, gardens and the beach. The physical relationships from the various residences were not clearly defined, and the established logic was restricted to a subset of regulars.

Famous alumni
There was a high turnover of young performers in the series, and indeed it was a training ground for many stars including Peter Mochrie in his debut as Ric Moran. He would go on to appear in film Winter of Our Dreams starring Bryan Brown and Judy Davis.

Others included Lenore Smith, Penny Cook (A Country Practice and E Street), Anna Hruby, Martin Sacks (Blue Heelers), Warren Blondell, Joanne Stanley, Lisa Crittenden (Sons and  Daughters, Prisoner) and Jacqui Gordon, while Peter Phelps and Kim Lewis would also find fame on Sons and Daughters.

Broadcast

The Restless Years originally screened in most areas at 7.30 pm in one-hour installments, twice a week Tuesday and Thursday

For all but the last three weeks of its 1981 season, the series screened in Melbourne as five thirty-minute episodes stripped across each weeknight at 7.00 pm. It was moved to 5.30 pm for the last three weeks, with final episode reached on Thursday, 12 November 1981.

In Sydney in mid 1981 the series switched to running as a single one-hour episode on Wednesday nights at 7.30 pm.

Remakes

The show was remade in the Netherlands as Goede tijden, slechte tijden (first broadcast 1990) which in turn was remade in Germany as Gute Zeiten, schlechte Zeiten (since 1992): both these titles mean "Good times, bad times". As of 2021, the Dutch and German shows are still running – although they have long since diverged from the original Australian storylines – and are the highest rated soap operas in their respective countries. Apart from the similar title, the shows are currently also very different from each other with unique characters and very different plotlines.

See also 
 List of Australian television series

References

External links 
 
 
 The Restless Years at the National Film and Sound Archive

Australian television soap operas
Network 10 original programming
Television series produced by The Reg Grundy Organisation
Television shows set in New South Wales
1977 Australian television series debuts
1981 Australian television series endings
English-language television shows